The Duffy House is a historic house at 124 East "A" Street in North Little Rock, Arkansas.  It is a two-story stuccoed structure with a tile roof in the Spanish Colonial style, with a single-story addition to the west, and a garage to the southwest, with a small attached maid's quarters.  The house was built in 1929 by Justin Stewart as part of a large subdivision.  Due to the effects of the Great Depression, it remained unsold for several years, and typifies the houses built in the subdivision before the 1929 stock market crash.

The house was listed on the National Register of Historic Places in 2014.

See also
National Register of Historic Places listings in Pulaski County, Arkansas

References

Houses on the National Register of Historic Places in Arkansas
Houses completed in 1929
Houses in North Little Rock, Arkansas
Mediterranean Revival architecture in the United States
National Register of Historic Places in Pulaski County, Arkansas